Emerging Voices is a live album by Jesus Culture, featuring Mary Kat Ehrenzeller, Justin Jarvis, Derek Johnson, and Nate Ward. Jesus Culture Music released the album on July 31, 2012. They worked with Jeremy Edwardson and Banning Liebscher in the production of this album.

Critical reception

In a review for AllMusic, David Jeffries rated the album three and a half stars, saying, "Emerging Voices an easy recommendation." Marcus Hathcock's four-star review from New Release Tuesday states, "There are a lot of powerful moments on this collection of Emerging Voices." Giving the album five stars at Louder Than the Music, Jono Davies writes, "this album is the perfect showcase album."

Track listing

Charts

References 

2012 live albums
Jesus Culture albums
Live contemporary Christian music albums